WZNC-LP (99.9 FM, "NCCR - North Country Community Radio") is a radio station licensed to serve the community of Bethlehem, New Hampshire. The station is owned by Friends of the Colonial and airs a variety format.

The station was assigned the WZNC-LP call letters by the Federal Communications Commission on February 25, 2014.

References

External links
 Official Website
 FCC Public Inspection File for WZNC-LP
 

ZNC-LP
ZNC-LP
Radio stations established in 2014
2014 establishments in New Hampshire
Variety radio stations in the United States
Bethlehem, New Hampshire